The Eurovision Song Contest 1981 was the 26th edition of the annual Eurovision Song Contest. Organised by the European Broadcasting Union (EBU) and host broadcaster  (RTÉ), the contest was held at the RDS Simmonscourt on 4 April 1981, and was hosted by Irish television journalist Doireann Ní Bhriain.

Twenty countries participated in the contest, equalling the record of the 1978 edition. Cyprus made their début this year, while Israel and Yugoslavia both returned to the competition, after their one-year and five-year absences, respectively. Morocco and Italy decided not to participate. Morocco has never since returned to participate in the Eurovision Song contest again, marking 1980 their only ever year of participation.

The winner was the United Kingdom with the song "Making Your Mind Up", performed by Bucks Fizz, written by Andy Hill and John Danter. Germany finished second for the second consecutive year, while France finished third. Norway again finished last, with its third nul points in the contest.

Bucks Fizz's win launched the group's hugely successful international career. Their performance on the Eurovision stage included a dance-routine where the two male members ripped the skirts off the two female members only to reveal mini-skirts, and today stands as one of the most defining moments in the contest's history.

Location

Having won in 1980, head of Irish broadcaster RTÉ, Brian MacLochlainn announced that they would host the contest in 1981 within hours of Johnny Logan winning. The 1981 contest took place in Dublin, the capital of Ireland. It was the second time the country (and city) had hosted the contest, the last time being ten years earlier in 1971.

Format
The contest took place under heavy guard at the 1,600 seat Simmonscourt Pavilion of the RDS, which was normally used for agricultural and horse shows. The set was the largest ever seen in the contest so far, being 150 feet across, 80 feet deep and 30 feet high. Over 250 armed soldiers and police were on hand to protect against any likely political demonstrations, with the UK entrants being under constant guard during their time in Dublin due to threats from the IRA. This included an evacuation of the participants hotel at one point due to a bomb scare. The security measures were reported on British news reports on the day of the contest.

Rehearsals at the Pavilion began on 31 March with each act allowed 30 minutes with the orchestra, continuing up until the day of the contest, which ended with a dress rehearsal at 16:30. On 1 April, the Irish Tourist Board held a reception for the contest at Jurys Hotel, Dublin.
 
The presenter on this occasion was Doireann Ni Bhriain, who was well known in Ireland at the time as a TV presenter and for the current affairs radio show Women Today. She was chosen for her fluency in Irish and English as well as having studied French and Spanish, which she spoke with some ease. She had also worked on the 1971 contest as an interpreter in the RTE press office. The director was Ian McGarry, while Noel Kelehan was the chief conductor of the RTÉ Concert Orchestra, which comprised 46 musicians.

It cost RTÉ £530,000 to stage the show, although this included £110,000 from the EBU. From this, the Irish Government expected to make around £2,000,000 from tourism as a result of staging the show. It was expected that the worldwide audience would be some 500 million with 30 countries broadcasting the event, including countries such as Hong Kong, the Soviet Union, United Arab Emirates and for the first time, Egypt.

Each song was introduced by a filmed 'postcard', framed by an animated identification of the nation's location. Unlike previous films used in 1970 and 1976 that had also featured the performing artist, the 1981 films prominently included the authors and composers alongside the performing artist.

Entrants
Of the performers, many previous contestants returned to the contest this year. Notably, Jean-Claude Pascal for Luxembourg, who had won the contest 20 years earlier, although could only manage 11th place this time. Repeated entrants Peter, Sue and Marc returned for the fourth time, after 1971, 1976 and 1979. Performing again for Switzerland, they remain the only act to sing in four different languages (French, English, German and this time, Italian). Other returnees were Marty Brem who had taken part the year before for Austria, Tommy Seebach for Denmark, and Björn Skifs for Sweden. Bucks Fizz member, Cheryl Baker had performed in 1978 with the band Co-Co for the UK, while Sheeba member Maxi had performed as a solo artist in 1973 for Ireland.

The 46-piece Irish TV orchestra didn't have a saxophone as they didn't consider it an orchestral instrument, which caused great concern with the United Kingdom entry as a saxophone appeared heavily on their song. Andy Hill – the producer of the single – said that had they known, they would have dropped one of the two backing singers to be replaced by a saxophonist, there being two on the actual recording.

Interval
The interval act was traditional Irish band Planxty, who performed the lengthy piece "Timedance", which depicted Irish music through the ages.  The dancers were from Dublin City Ballet with choreography by Iain Montague. This is seen as a precursor to Riverdance, which became famous after its performance in 1994. The song, which was written by Bill Whelan, went on to be released as a Planxty single and became a No.3 hit in the Irish charts. The interval (as well as the presentation sequences) had been rehearsed on set on the 3 April, the day before the event.

This mix of past and present was also the theme to the contest's opening montage, which featured shots of Celtic ruins, cliffs and castles, edited together with close-ups of art, aeroplanes, architecture and horse races. This was also apparent in the style of music played by the orchestra.

Voting segment
The voting proved to be memorable for its closeness. France gained an early lead gaining maximum points from three of the first four juries. Ireland then started to take the lead during the first half, but fell away afterwards. The UK took the lead then until they gave top points to Switzerland, putting them in pole position. From then on it was a race between the UK, Switzerland and Germany, who had started to gain a lot of high marks. In all, five countries took pole position at various stages: UK, Germany, France, Switzerland and Ireland. Just before the penultimate vote, three countries (UK, Germany and Switzerland) were all on equal top marks. After this, Switzerland (who had performed second last) were unable to collect points as it was their jury's results that were being announced, while Germany failed to receive votes either. The UK gained eight, which meant that when the final jury (Sweden) were about to cast their votes, the UK needed five points or more to win over either country. Switzerland were quickly eliminated by receiving just one vote. The UK passed the five-point mark and received eight votes, while Germany did indeed receive the maximum 12 points, but it was too late. France finished third, with Switzerland fourth and the hosts Ireland coming in fifth. Of these, Switzerland received the most top votes despite only finishing fourth, while the UK only received two. The UK did however receive points from every competing country. At a four-point victory, this was the closest win to date under the current voting structure. Meanwhile, at the other end of the board was Norway, who finished last with no points for the third time in Eurovision history, gaining no points in 1963 and 1978 as well.

Other memorable moments included a glitch in the scoreboard, giving host country Ireland 310 extra points instead of the 10 designated by the Luxembourg jury, Greece's score registering on the scoreboard as incorrect, while on the final vote, Turkey's nine points suddenly disappeared. EBU scrutineer for the contest, Frank Naef had to twice halt the voting process as mistakes were being made by the jurors spokespersons, one example is when he had to talk with the Austrian jury in Vienna, telling them they had to start giving their points starting from one, as they had started by giving 5 points to Germany. Host Doireann then repeated in French what Frank had said to the spokesperson, Jenny Pippal, who started from one point after that. Also of note was when the host attempted to collect Yugoslavia's votes, after repeated attempts to contact them, Yugoslavia's spokeswoman, Helga Vlahović (who went on to present the 1990 contest) finally answered the phone and abruptly answered "I don't have it", causing laughter to erupt from the audience.

Aftermath
Runner-up Lena Valaitis was in good spirits while talking to the press following the contest and largely unconcerned about losing. Swedish singer Björn Skifs however was more outspoken saying; "This was not a song contest, it was a show – all these dancing girls, they take away from the songs. I also think there should be a change in the rules to allow us to sing in English. Then we would really be able to compete."  Harald Tusberg, head of light entertainment for Norwegian television was upbeat about Norway's 'nul points' result as he claimed that their entry would be remembered above many others; "Who remembers who came second or third – people will remember us!". Finn Kalvik himself conceded graciously saying that he had enjoyed the week's holiday.

Following this year's contest, France did not compete the following year, with the broadcaster announcing that the songs were "a monument to drivel". Indeed, many comments had been made regarding the quality of the winning group's performance indicating that the song had most likely won by style over substance. Either way, Bucks Fizz went on to have a very successful career over the next few years, and became one of the top-selling groups of the 1980s. The winning song itself reached No.1 in nine countries and became a top ten hit in nations such as Australia, New Zealand and South Africa, selling four million copies worldwide.

Germany, who had never won the contest at this point, were becoming increasingly frustrated with their second placings in this and the previous year's contest and made a concerted effort for the following year. This was to pay off, as in 1982 they finally clinched their first victory which was achieved in an overwhelming manner.

The UK's victory this year meant that the contest would take place in the UK the following year – the seventh time the country had hosted the event (a record unbeaten and later extended by an eighth UK hosting in 1998).  The BBC opted to take it to the North Yorkshire town of Harrogate at a later than usual date, 24 April. The 1981 contest was held on 4 April and to date the contest has never been as early again.

Decades later, Debbie Cameron, who represented Denmark with Tommy Seebach, revealed in a book about Seebach that she was contacted by a BBC employee, who told her that Bucks Fizz's victory was planned. According to the employee, he had witnessed how BBC technicians had sabotaged the sound checks during the rehearsal of the Danish, the Israeli and the German performances. This claim however ignores the fact that the BBC did not host the 1981 contest.

On August 22, 1981, the town of Mysen in Norway held a televised, live concert to celebrate the 25th anniversary of the contest, despite the recent 26th edition. The show Songs of Europe featured all but eight of the former winners of the contest, although one of the missing winning artists, Teddy Scholten, attended the event but did not perform.

Participating countries 
By October 1980, it looked as though 21 countries were planning to take part, the largest number so far, but Monaco declared that they were no longer interested. This year marked the début of Cyprus in the contest, who finished sixth. Returning to the contest was Israel, who did not compete the previous year, despite winning the two years prior to that. They finished seventh. Yugoslavia also returned to the competition after a five-year absence. Italy decided not to enter due to lack of interest, while Morocco declined to take part after their debut entry the year before. The draw for the running order took place on 14 November 1980, with it being confirmed that there were a total of 20 entrants.

Conductors 
Each performance had a conductor who directed the orchestra.

 Richard Oesterreicher
 Onno Tunç
 
 Joël Rocher
 
 Allan Botschinsky
 Ranko Rihtman
 Henrik Otto Donner
 David Sprinfield
 Joan Barcons
 Rogier van Otterloo
 Noel Kelehan
 Sigurd Jansen
 John Coleman
 
 Giuseppe Marchese
 Yiorgos Niarchos
 
 Rolf Zuckowski
 Anders Berglund

Returning artists 
Bold indicates a previous winner.

Participants and results

Detailed voting results 

Each country had a jury who awarded 12, 10, 8, 7, 6, 5, 4, 3, 2, 1 point(s) for their top ten songs.

12 points 
Below is a summary of all 12 points in the final:

Spokespersons 

Listed below is the order in which votes were cast during the 1981 contest along with the spokesperson who was responsible for announcing the votes for their respective country.

 
 Başak Doğru
 TBC
 Jacques Harvey
 
 
 Helga Vlahović
 Annemi Genetz
 Denise Fabre
 
 Flip van der Schalie
 John Skehan
 
 Colin Berry
 
 Walter De Meyere
 Tatiana Darra
 Anna Partelidou
 Michel Stocker
 Bengteric Nordell

Broadcasts 

Each participating broadcaster was required to relay the contest via its networks. Non-participating EBU member broadcasters were also able to relay the contest as "passive participants". Broadcasters were able to send commentators to provide coverage of the contest in their own native language and to relay information about the artists and songs to their television viewers.

Known details on the broadcasts in each country, including the specific broadcasting stations and commentators are shown in the tables below. In addition to the participating countries, the contest was also reportedly broadcast in Iceland, in Bulgaria, Czechoslovakia, Hungary, Poland, Romania and the Soviet Union via Intervision, and in Egypt, Hong Kong, South Korea and the United Arab Emirates.

Notes

References

External links

 

 
1981
Music festivals in Ireland
1980s in Irish television
1981 in Ireland
1981 in music
1980s in Dublin (city)
April 1981 events in Europe
Events in Dublin (city)